Things to Learn is the debut album released by Australian band The Silents.  It was released on 29 March 2008 through Ivy League Records. It features the singles "Nightcrawl", "23" and "Little Girl Lost".

The album was mixed by Doug Boehm at Sunset Sound in Los Angeles.

Track listing
All songs written by Lloyd Stowe, James Terry, Sam Ford, Alex Board, except where noted.

 "Things To Learn" - 2:50
 "Ophelia" - 3:18
 "23" - 2:31
 "Tune for a Nymph" - 3:01
 "Turn Black" - 2:28
 "Nightcrawl" - 2:49
 "Little Girl Lost" - 3:34
 "Devils" - 3:38
 "See The Future" - 5:58
 "Astral Child" - 3:41
 "Generation Space" - 2:58
 "Bruised Sky" (Lloyd Stowe, Alex Board) - 3:54

References

External links
 Rave Magazine review
 Mess + Noise Magazine review
 Beat Magazine review
 The Dwarf.com review
 RTRFM review

2008 debut albums
The Silents albums
Ivy League Records albums